NAM is a 1986 video game published by Strategic Simulations for the Apple II, Atari 8-bit family, and Commodore 64.

Gameplay
NAM is a game in which the daily warfare by US army units in South Vietnam is simulated.

Reception
Mark Bausman reviewed the game for Computer Gaming World, and stated that "As a simulation of the tactics of the Vietnam war it is too generic. But, as an introductory wargame Nam has value as it is highly playable."

Reviews
Zzap! - Nov, 1986
Computer Gaming World - Jun, 1991
Commodore User (Nov, 1986)

References

External links
Review in ANALOG Computing
Review in InCider
Review in Compute!'s Gazette
Review in Ahoy!

1986 video games
Apple II games
Atari 8-bit family games
Commodore 64 games
Computer wargames
Strategic Simulations games
Turn-based strategy video games
Video games developed in the United States
Video games set in Vietnam